The 2022 MPBL Playoffs, or known as the 2022 OKBet-MPBL Playoffs presented by Xtreme Appliances for sponsorship reasons, is the postseason tournament of the 2022 MPBL season. This was the league's fourth overall, and the third post-season under a new format. The postseason tournament began on October 15, 2022, two days after the end of the regular season on October 13, 2022.

Overview 
 The defending champions, Davao Occidental Tigers, did not participate this season, thus, the championship will guarantee a new champion.
 The Nueva Ecija Rice Vanguards earned its first playoff appearance as the league's top seed after posing a 21–0 season win sweep record, thus, holding the homecourt advantage throughout the playoffs. 
 Aside from the Nueva Ecija Rice Vanguards, the Marikina Shoemasters made its first playoff appearance in the Northern Division.
 For the Southern Division, the Bacolod Bingo Plus, Rizal EMKAI Xentromall, and Sarangani Marlins made their first playoff appearances.
 The Bataan Risers and Batangas City Embassy Chill entered the playoffs for the fourth consecutive season.
 The Bacoor Strikers, GenSan Warriors, San Juan Knights, and Zamboanga Family's Brand Sardines entered the playoffs for the third consecutive season.
 The Pampanga Giant Lanterns, and Pasig City MCW Sports entered the playoffs for the second consecutive season.
 The Muntinlupa Cagers and Quezon City MG entered the playoffs for the first time since 2019.
 The Valenzuela XUR Homes Realty Inc. entered the playoffs for the first time since 2018.

Bracket 
Teams in bold advanced to the next round. The numbers to the left of each team indicate the team's seeding in its division, and the numbers to the right indicate the number of games the team won in that round. Teams with home-court advantage, the higher-seeded team, are shown in italics.

First round

Northern Division

(1) Nueva Ecija Rice Vanguards vs. (8) Marikina Shoemasters 

This is the first playoff meeting between the Rice Vanguards and the Shoemasters.

(2) Pasig City MCW Sports vs. (8) Quezon City MG 

This is the first playoff meeting between Pasig City and Quezon City MG.

(3) San Juan Knights vs. (8) Valenzuela XUR Homes Realty Inc. 

This is the first playoff meeting between the Knights and Valenzuela.

(4) Pampanga Giant Lanterns vs. (5) Bataan Risers 

This is the second playoff meeting between the Giant Lanterns and Risers with the Giant Lanterns winning the first one in the 2020 Playoffs.

Southern Division

(1) Zamboanga Family's Brand Sardines vs. (8) Muntinlupa Cagers 

This is the second playoff meeting between Zamboanga and the Cagers with Zamboanga winning the first one in the 2019 Playoffs.

(2) Batangas City Embassy Chill vs. (7) Bacoor City Strikers 

This is the first playoff meeting between Batangas City and the Strikers.

(3) Sarangani Marlins vs. (6) Rizal EMKAI Xentromall 

This is the first playoff meeting between the Marlins and Rizal.

(4) GenSan Warriors vs. (5) Bacolod Bingo Plus 

This is the first playoff meeting between the Warriors and Bacolod.

Division semifinals

Northern Division

(1) Nueva Ecija Rice Vanguards vs. (4) Pampanga Giant Lanterns 

This is the first playoff meeting between the Rice Vanguards and the Giant Lanterns.

(2) Pasig City MCW Sports vs. (3) San Juan Knights 

This is the first playoff meeting between Pasig City and the Knights.

Southern Division

(1) Zamboanga Family's Brand Sardines vs. (5) Bacolod Bingo Plus 

This is the first playoff meeting between Zamboanga and Bacolod.

(2) Batangas City Embassy Chill vs. (6) Rizal Golden Coolers Xentromall 

This is the first playoff meeting between Batangas City and the Golden Coolers.

Division finals

Northern Division

(1) Nueva Ecija Rice Vanguards vs. (3) San Juan Knights 

This is the first playoff meeting between the Rice Vanguards and the Knights.

Southern Division

(1) Zamboanga Family's Brand Sardines vs. (2) Batangas City Embassy Chill 

This is the second playoff meeting between Zamboanga and Batangas City with Zamboanga winning the first one in the 2020 Playoffs.

2022 MPBL Finals: (N1) Nueva Ecija Rice Vanguards vs. (S1) Zamboanga Family's Brand Sardines   

The Nueva Ecija Rice Vanguards and the Zamboanga Family's Brand Sardines competed in the MPBL Finals to determine the fourth MPBL champion. 

This was the first championship meeting between the Rice Vanguards and Zamboanga.

References 

Maharlika Pilipinas Basketball League
2022 in Philippine sport